Great Bend Township is a township in Barton County, Kansas, United States.  As of the 2010 census, its population was 1,752.

Great Bend Township was organized in 1872.

Geography
According to the USGS, it contains two cemeteries: Golden Belt Memorial Park and Great Bend.

The stream of Dry Walnut Creek runs through this township.

Transportation
Great Bend Township contains two airports or landing strips: Button Airport and Great Bend Municipal Airport.

References
 USGS Geographic Names Information System (GNIS)

External links
 US-Counties.com
 City-Data.com

Townships in Barton County, Kansas
Townships in Kansas